William L. White Auditorium, commonly known as White Auditorium, is a 5,000 seat multi-purpose arena in Emporia, Kansas. It is home  to the Emporia State University men's and women's basketball teams, as well as the volleyball team.

History
The Emporia Civic Auditorium's – as it was known from 1940 to 1973 – construction began to in December 1938. On May 6, 1940, the City of Emporia kicked off a five-day "Fiestaval" to celebrate its opening. In 1963, it was renamed to its current name, William L. White Auditorium, named after local newspaper owner, William Lindsay White, who was also the son of William Allen White.

In December 1940, the Teachers College basketball team began playing their home games at the Auditorium, and in 1974 for the Emporia State Lady Hornets basketball games have been played there as well. When the volleyball program was established in 1973, it began to play its home games in White Auditorium. The building also hosts the Kansas State High School Activities Association state basketball tournament since 1955.

Upgrades
During the 1994–95 basketball season, the Auditorium was renovated and bleacher seating was added to the south end of the court, expanding the seating capacity from 3,700 to 5,000. In 2008, White Auditorium went under renovation. A new color scheme was painted throughout the building, new scoreboards were added, the basketball court was refinished, and new seats replaced the wooden seats in the upper Auditorium.

Slaymaker Court
On February 20, 2013, the Emporia City Commission voted to name the floor of White Auditorium, Coach Slay, Ron Slaymaker Court, named after longtime men's basketball coach and ESU's winningest coach. On February 28, 2013, one week later, during the halftime of the men's ESU-Washburn game, Ron Slaymaker, and his family, alongside ESU President Michael D. Shonrock, ESU Athletic Director Kent Weiser, and the Mayor of Emporia, Bobbi Mlynar, unveiled the design of Ron Slaymaker Court, debuting in the fall of 2013.

References

External links
 

Indoor arenas in Kansas
College basketball venues in the United States
Emporia State Hornets basketball venues
Sports venues in Kansas
Basketball venues in Kansas
Buildings and structures in Lyon County, Kansas
Emporia, Kansas